Oscar Brevi (born 15 December 1967) is an Italian football manager and a former defender.

Career

Player
Brevi from 1995 to 2009 has played for Solbiatese, Lumezzane, Como, Palermo, Ascoli, Torino and Venezia.

Coach
On 20 October 2009 he was named, together with Ottavio Strano, to replace Stefano Di Chiara as Como new head coach, thus putting an end to his playing career.

In the 2011–12 season he was appointed as the head coach of Lega Pro Prima Divisione side Cremonese; he also served as the team's coach in the next season, until 25 September 2012, when he was sacked.

He was appointed head coach of Serie C club Renate on 5 June 2018. He was fired on 15 October 2018, with Renate in 14th place.

On 14 December 2020, Brevi returned into management as the new head coach of Serie C club Giana Erminio. He was fired by Giana Erminio on 10 November 2021, with the club in 17th place in the standings.

Personal life
Oscar's younger brother Ezio is a former Serie A football player and former head coach of Voluntas Spoleto in Serie D.

References

External links
 Oscar's profile from Gazetta dello Sport

1967 births
Footballers from Rome
Living people
Italian footballers
Como 1907 players
Palermo F.C. players
Ascoli Calcio 1898 F.C. players
Torino F.C. players
Venezia F.C. players
Association football defenders
Serie A players
Italian football managers
Calcio Padova managers
Como 1907 managers
U.S. Cremonese managers
S.E.F. Torres 1903 players
U.S. Catanzaro 1929 managers